Ela is a surname. People with the surname are as follows:

 Acacio Mañé Ela (–1959), Equatoguinean nationalist and politician
 Florencio Mayé Elá (born 1944), Equatoguinean politician
 George Ela (1868–1957), American politician
 Jacob Hart Ela (1820–1884), American politician
 Jacinto Elá (born 1982), Equatoguinean footballer
 Jean-Marc Ela (1936–2008), Cameroonian priest
 Mohamed Aboul Ela (born 1980), Egyptian footballer
 Regina Mañe Ela (1954–2015), Equatoguinean politician
 Ruslan Elá (born 1983), Equatoquinean footballer

See also
 Ela (name)